Lars Englund (born 6 May 1933 in Stockholm) is a Swedish sculptor and painter active since 1953.

He was awarded the Prince Eugen Medal for sculpture in 1993.

His piece Stabil (stable) was displayed at Amphoe Takua Pa in memorial to the tsunami victims.

References 

1933 births
Living people
Artists from Stockholm
Recipients of the Prince Eugen Medal
Swedish contemporary artists